Woodsia oregana, the Oregon cliff fern, is a perennial fern in the family Woodsiaceae.

This plant is native to a large part of the western and northern United States and Canada.

References

External links
Jepson Manual Treatment
Flora of North America
Washington Burke Museum
Photo gallery

oregana
Ferns of the United States
Flora of the Western United States
Flora of Canada